Natkatia is a village in West Champaran district in the Indian state of Bihar.

Demographics
As of 2011 India census, Natkatia had a population of 1070 in 247 households. Males constitute 51.9% of the population and females 48%. Natkatia has an average literacy rate of 43.17%, lower than the national average of 74%: male literacy is 61.47%, and female literacy is 38.52%. In Natkatia, 20.8% of the population is under 6 years of age.

References

Villages in West Champaran district